Rocky is a 1976 film starring Sylvester Stallone.

Rocky may also refer to:

Computing 
 Rocky Linux, a Linux distribution

Films 
 Rocky (franchise), an American film franchise that debuted with the film Rocky in 1976
 Rocky Balboa (film), the sixth film in the series from 2006
 Rocky (1948 film), an American film starring Roddy McDowall
 Rocky (1981 film), an Indian Bollywood film starring Sanjay Dutt
 Rocky (2006 Hindi film), an Indian Bollywood action film
 Rocky (2008 film), an Indian Kannada-language film
 Rocky (2013 film), an Indian Bengali-language film
 Rocky (2021 film), an Indian Tamil-language film

People 
 ASAP Rocky, American rapper
 Rocky (nickname)
 Rocky (singer), South Korean singer, rapper and member of boy group Astro
 Rocky Dellesara, Canadian professional wrestler from NWA: All-Star Wrestling
 Rocky Elsom, Australian rugby player
 Rocky Fielding, British former professional boxer
 Rocky Kramer, Norwegian rock guitarist and singer
 Rocky Graziano, American boxing middleweight champion
 Rocky Marciano, American boxing heavyweight champion
 Rocky Marshall, English actor
 Rocky Maivia, a former ring name of Dwayne Johnson, American actor and professional wrestler
 Rocky Votolato, American musician

Characters

In film
 Rocky Balboa, in the Rocky Franchise
 Rocky Sullivan, in Angels with Dirty Faces
 Rocky and Mugsy, in various Looney Tunes and Merrie Melodies media
 Rocky the Rooster, in Chicken Run
 Rocky, in Don't Breathe
 Rocky, in The Rocky Horror Picture Show
 Rocky Gibraltar, a character in Toy Story
 Rocky, a gangster in Fat Pizza
 Rocky, in 3 Ninjas

In television
 Rocky DeSantos, in Mighty Morphin Power Rangers and Power Rangers: Zeo
 Rocky the Flying Squirrel, in The Rocky and Bullwinkle Show
 Rocky Robinson, a character in The Amazing World of Gumball
 Rocky, in the Canadian animated series PAW Patrol
 Joseph "Rocky" Rockford, in The Rockford Files
 Rocky Blue, a character in Shake It Up

Other characters
 Rocky Rodent, in the video game Rocky Rodent
 An anthropomorphic dog in Rocky (comic strip)
 Rocky, a Simon Kidgits dog character developed by Simon Brand Ventures

Video games 
 Rocky (1987 video game), for the Sega Master System
 Rocky (2002 video game), for the Nintendo GameCube, PlayStation 2, Xbox, and Game Boy Advance

Music
 Rocky (soundtrack), a soundtrack album from the 1976 film
 "Rocky" (song), a song from the Dickey Lee album Rocky (1975)
 "Rocky", a song from the Eric Burdon album Survivor (1977)
 "Rocky", a song from the Mike Oldfield album Light + Shade (2005)
 "Rocky", a song from The Lonely Island album Turtleneck & Chain (2011)
 "Rocky", a painted Fender Stratocaster guitar used by George Harrison; see List of guitars

Places
 Rocky, Oklahoma, a town
 Rocky Branch (New Hampshire), a river in the White Mountains of New Hampshire
 Rocky Harbour (Hong Kong)
 Rocky Harbour, Newfoundland and Labrador, Canada
 Rocky Mountains, a major mountain range in western North America
 Rocky Run (Bull Creek), a stream in Southwestern Pennsylvania
 A common nickname for Rockhampton, a city in Australia
 Rocky, Tuvalu, a former name of the island of Niulakita

Mascots
 Rocky the Bull, mascot of the University of South Florida
 Rocky the Mountain Lion, mascot of the Denver Nuggets
 Rocky the Bulldog, mascot of the US Army 3rd Infantry Division
 Rocky the Lion, mascot for Slippery Rock University of Pennsylvania
 Rocky the Lion, mascot for Widener University
 Rocky the Red Hawk, mascot of Montclair State University
 Rocky the Rocket, mascot of the University of Toledo
 Rocky the Yellowjacket, mascot of the University of Rochester
 Rocky Raccoon, the mascot of the Minix OS

Other uses
 The adjective word for a rock (geology)
 Rocky the bear, a trained grizzly bear best known for appearing as Dewey the Killer Bear in 2008 film Semi-Pro
 Rocky Brands, American manufacturer of outdoor apparel and accessories

See also
 Rocky Balboa (disambiguation)
 Daihatsu Rocky (disambiguation)
 Rockey (disambiguation)
 Rockies (disambiguation)
 Rock (disambiguation)